Pygospila costiflexalis is a species of moth of the family Crambidae. The species was described by Achille Guenée in 1854. It is found in south-east Asia, including India, Sri Lanka and Indonesia.

Description
It differs from Pygospila tyres in being cupreous brown with a faint purple tinge; the neck is fulvous; the thoracic stripes are obscure and brownish, the abdominal spots small. Forewing with the sub-basal markings obsolescent; the three submarginal spots absent, and the spots below vein 2 minute. Hindwing with the three submarginal spots and the spot below vein 2 obsolescent.

The wingspan is about 42 mm.

References

Spilomelinae
Moths of Asia
Moths described in 1854